Kewaunee County Bruemmer Park and Zoo is a park located west of Kewaunee, Wisconsin. The park features a small zoo for several North American and at least three exotic animals. The park has wooded trails and borders the Kewaunee River. The park is built on bedrock and is home to limestone kiln remnants from early limestone production.

Species List for Zoo 
Whitetail Deer
Bobcat
Domestic Goat
Domestic Sheep
Arctic Fox
Indian Peafowl
Domestic Chicken
Domestic Duck
Domestic Goose

Future Developments 
The zoo plans on adding a new education centre and a pheasantry. Potential species include grey wolves, American black bears, and prairie dogs.

References

External links
 

Tourist attractions in Kewaunee County, Wisconsin
Zoos in Wisconsin